Commentator (foaled March 27, 2001), is an American Thoroughbred race horse by the stallion Distorted Humor, sire of 2003 Kentucky Derby winner Funny Cide.  Like Funny Cide, Commentator is a New York-bred as well as a gelding.  Distorted Humor also sired Hystericalady.

Commentator's dam, Outsource, was a daughter of Storm Bird, at two a champion in both England and Ireland and a stamina-producing sire.  Storm Bird, by Northern Dancer, also sired Storm Cat and Summer Squall.  Outsource was born small and deformed so she never raced or was trained.  Instead she was bred to Distorted Humor at only two years of age, and the result was  Commentator, making Outsource one of the youngest mares ever to produce a Grade I winner.  In 2002, Outsource was purchased in foal to Chief Seattle by Kentucky Governor Brereton Jones of Airdrie Stud near Midway, Kentucky for $25,000 at the Keeneland January mixed sale. She has a yearling full sister to Commentator, and delivered another Distorted Humor filly on February 16, 2008.

Bred by Michael Martinez in New York, Commentator went for $45,000 as a weanling (hip # 3230) in the Keeneland November Breeding Stock Sale. As a yearling, his price was $135,000 when he went to Tracy Farmer, who still owns him.  From the beginning, he was trained by Hall of Fame trainer Nick Zito.

Eight years old in 2009, the gelding made only 24 lifetime starts due to several small injuries (emerging from his races with foot problems and operated on for cannon-bone fracture injuries).  Zito said of Commentator, “There's no speed like him.  Who in their right mind would go with that horse?  Who could?  Is there a faster horse in the world?”

At three, Commentator won the seven-furlong Perryville Stakes, setting a track record  of 1:25.19.  At four, on August 5, 2005, he went wire to wire in the Grade I nine-furlong Whitney Handicap,  beating that year’s American Horse of the Year Saint Liam.  32,287 people crowded onto the Saratoga Race Course to watch Commentator, ridden by Gary Stevens, set the pace, then seem to tire as Saint Liam made his move.  But Commentator dug in, beating Saint Liam to the finish wire.  At five, he won the Mugatea Stakes at Belmont Park and at six, he placed in the Tom Fool Handicap, then took the Richmond Runner Stakes for New York–breds by 11 and a quarter lengths.  In the Richmond Runner, he ran 6 ½ furlongs in 1:15.69.

On October 27, 2007, entered in the Breeders' Cup Sprint at Monmouth Park, Commentator finished seventh on a very “sloppy track.” In January 2008, he won a Gulfstream Park allowance race in a 14 ½ length romp that set a track record.  Under jockey John Velazquez, he went 1:33:71 for a mile on the “fast” track.

Commentator, again ridden by Velazquez, won the Grade II Richter Scale Breeders' Cup Sprint Championship Handicap on March 9, 2008, by  13  ¾ lengths,  Pushed by Elite Squadron through early fractions of 22 seconds and 45.04, he led by five lengths at the top of the lane and then increased his lead with every stride.  Track announcer Larry Colmus called, "Here comes Commentator, the fastest horse in America."  Asked to comment on that call, Zito said, "Not only is that plausible, it has the added advantage of maybe being true." Commentator covered the Richter Scale's seven furlongs in 1:23.23.

On May 26, 2008, he ran  second in the Metropolitan Handicap at Belmont Park.  On July 26, 2008, he took his second Whitney Handicap wire-to-wire, at age 7 becoming the second-oldest horse to win that race.  (Kelso won it at age 8 in 1965.)  The race was run in deep mud after a deluge of rain at Saratoga.  Earning a 120 Beyer Speed Figure, Commentator, leading all the way and winning by 4¾ lengths, came home almost spotless.  With that win, he gained an automatic entry into the 2008 Breeders' Cup Classic.

On September 20, 2008, Commentator won the Massachusetts Handicap at Suffolk Downs by a record 14 lengths.  He was hand ridden throughout the stretch. The Mass Cap win carried an automatic entry into the Breeders' Cup Classic, which Commentator already had earned from his win in the 2008 Whitney. Zito  expressed a slight reluctance to ship Commentator to California's synthetic surface for the Breeders' Cup, to be run at Santa Anita in 2008.

Commentator’s average winning margin in his 14 career victories is over 10 lengths.  Over the years, he's won by margins of 7 lengths three times, 8 lengths, 9¾ lengths, 10½ lengths, 11¼ lengths, 13¾ lengths, 14 lengths twice, and 16½ lengths.  He's also earned Beyer Speed Figures of 119, 120, and 123.

Of all horses racing in 2008 (Big Brown, Curlin, Zenyatta, etc.), Commentator had the highest recorded Beyer Speed Figure both under and over a mile.

Commentator was a finalist for the Eclipse Award's American Champion Older Male Horse for 2008.  Curlin took the award. In 2007 and 2008, Commentator was New York Horse of Year.

On June 12, 2009, 8-year-old Commentator easily took the Kashatreya Stakes at Belmont Park by seven lengths as a prep towards  again winning the Whitney Handicap.  This win raised his bankroll to over $1,900,000 and kept him unbeaten in his six races against New York State-breds.

Retirement

After showing in the 2009 Whitney, Commentator's owners announced his retirement, saying he had nothing more to prove.  Tracy and Carol Farmer have chosen Old Friends Thoroughbred Retirement Farm in Georgetown, Kentucky as his permanent home.

On September 6, 2009 the New York Racing Association (NYRA) paid tribute to Commentator at Saratoga Race Course.  They named that day's fifth race, an overnight stakes race for New York–bred 3-year-olds and up, “The Commentator.”

Pedigree

References

 Commentator’s pedigree, stats, and photo
 Commentator’s sales and recent race history
 Commentator's Massachusetts Handicap victory
 Featured Inside Stride Magazine as part of Old Friends Story

2001 racehorse births
Thoroughbred family 1-c
Racehorses trained in the United States
Horse racing track record setters
Racehorses bred in New York (state)
Old Friends Equine Retirement